Second Church of Christ, Scientist may refer to:

 Second Church of Christ, Scientist (Long Beach, California)
 Second Church of Christ, Scientist (Los Angeles), California
 Second Church of Christ, Scientist (San Francisco, California)
 Second Church of Christ, Scientist (Manhattan), New York
 Second Church of Christ, Scientist (Milwaukee, Wisconsin), listed on the National Register of Historic Places in Milwaukee

See also
First Church of Christ, Scientist (disambiguation)

Christian Science churches